Jestofunk are an Italian acid jazz musical group, formed in 1992 by DJ MozArt (Claudio Rispoli) and DJ Blade. They collaborated with American musician CeCe Rogers on their 1995 début album, Love in a Black Dimension, as well as later projects. The album sold 50,000 copies in Italy. The group's 2000 album, Universal Mother, featured American singer Jocelyn Brown.

Discography

Albums

Singles

References

Acid jazz ensembles
Musical groups established in 1992
Italian house music groups